John Berchmans Conway, R.J.M. (born Bernadette Conway 1929 – 21 December 2022), usually known as Sister Berchmans, was an Irish Roman Catholic religious sister and teacher who worked in Pakistan for 60 years. In 2012 she was decorated by the Government of Pakistan for her services in education and promoting interfaith harmony.

Early life
Conway was born in County Clare, Ireland. In 1951 she joined the Congregation of the Religious of Jesus and Mary, founded by Claudine Thevenet in France in 1818, dedicated to caring for and educating the young and homeless. Very early, the congregation took on the task of education in other countries. The first Convent of Jesus and Mary in Pakistan was opened by four sisters in Lahore in 1876. She was sent to Pakistan in 1953 at the age of 24.

Work in Pakistan
Conway spent some 60 years teaching English and mathematics. She taught girls in Jesus and Mary Convents in Lahore, Murree and Karachi. She completed her Diamond Jubilee, or 60th year, of religious profession in the Religious of Jesus and Mary in December 2011.

Notable students were Benazir Bhutto, the late Prime Minister of Pakistan, who was assassinated in 2007, and Asma Jahangir, a noted human rights activist.

Personal life and death 
Conway died on 21 December 2022, at the age of 93.

Awards and recognition
On 15 February 2012, the President of Pakistan approved conferment of the Sitara (Urdu: Star) class of the Nishan-e-Quaid-i-Azam award on Conway for her services in education and promoting interfaith harmony in Pakistan.

On 25 March 2012, more than 600 people gathered at St. Anthony’s Church for a special Mass to celebrate the conferral of the country’s highest civilian award on Conway and the Rev. Robert McCulloch, S.S.C.

In July 2019, St Mary's University, Twickenham awarded Sister Berchmans Conway the Benedict Medal in recognition of almost 70 years of teaching.

In 2020 the Karachi Administration named a road in Clifton in her honour. The Berchmans Road was dedicated to her in recognition for her services to education.

References

1929 births
2022 deaths
People from County Clare
20th-century Irish nuns
Female Roman Catholic missionaries
Missionary educators
Roman Catholic missionaries in Pakistan
Recipients of the Nishan-e-Quaid-i-Azam
Irish emigrants to Pakistan
21st-century Irish nuns
Pakistani schoolteachers